The Wright Model B was an early pusher biplane designed by the Wright brothers in the United States in 1910. It was the first of their designs to be built in quantity. Unlike  the Model A, it featured a true elevator carried at the tail rather than at the front. It was the last Wright model to have an open-frame tail. The Model B was a dedicated two-seater with the pilot and a passenger sitting side by side on the leading edge of the lower wing.

Besides their civil market, the Wrights were able to sell aircraft to the Aeronautical Division, U.S. Signal Corps (S.C. 3, 4, and 5) and to the United States Navy as hydroplanes (AH-4, -5-, and -6), in which services they were used as trainers. Furthermore, the Wrights were able to sell licenses to produce the aircraft domestically (to the Burgess Company and Curtis, which designated it Model F), as well as in Germany. The deal with Burgess was the first license-production of aircraft undertaken in the United States and most of the approximately one hundred Model Bs produced were actually built by Burgess. A modified Model B, redesignated Model EX (for Exhibition) achieved fame as the Vin Fiz Flyer, the first aircraft to cross the United States. Burgess also planned a refined version as the Model G, but this was never built.

Variants
Model B
Two-seat sports biplane, powered by a 35-hp (26-kW) Wright piston engine.
Model B-1
Civil seaplane variant with two steel and aluminum pontoons.
Model B-2
Civil seaplane variant with a single float.
Model EX
This modified Model B was the first aircraft to cross the United States.
Model F
This version was built under license by the Burgess Company.
Model G
Unbuilt version, it was intended to be built by Burgess Company.
Model G Aeroboat
Two aircraft, built for the US Navy in 1913 and 1914, similar to the Model F, and designated AH-19.

Operators

 United States Army
 United States Navy

Surviving aircraft and replicas
At least two original Model Bs were extant in 2007. 
 An original Model B is on display at the National Museum of the United States Air Force in Dayton, Ohio. This aircraft was used for flight instruction by Mr. Howard Rinehart at Mineola, New York in 1916. It last flew during the International Air Races at Dayton in October 1924. It was placed on exhibit in the Museum in October 1962 by Eugene W. Kettering, Chairman of the Board of Trustees for the Air Force Museum Foundation.
 An original Model B on display at the Franklin Institute in Philadelphia, Pennsylvania, was purchased by Grover Cleveland Bergdoll in 1912 from Orville Wright.
 A replica of the Burgess-Wright Model F is displayed at Hill Aerospace Museum, Ogden, Utah.
 Wright B Flyers Inc., a non-profit organization based at a museum-hangar at Dayton-Wright Brothers Airport in Dayton, Ohio, owns one replica and one look-alike Wright "B" Flyer. A third look-alike was lost in a crash in 2011.
 Wright "B" Flyer No. 001 (FAA registration number N3786B) is a flying look-alike nicknamed "Brown Bird". It was built in the late 1970s.
 Wright "B" Flyer A "Valentine Flyer" (also called the "Yellow Bird") is a non-flying near-replica originally constructed by Tom and Nancy Valentine as a flying model for the TV-movie The Winds of Kitty Hawk in 1978. The aircraft has not flown since being damaged during filming. The "Yellow Bird" is a more accurate replica of the Model B than either 001 or 002.
Replicas on display:
 College Park Aviation Museum, College Park, Maryland.
 United States Army Aviation Museum, Fort Rucker, Alabama.
 United States Naval Academy, Annapolis, Maryland.
 Virginia Aviation Museum, Richmond, Virginia.
 EAA Aviation Museum, Oshkosh, Wisconsin.

Specifications

See also

References
Notes

Bibliography
 
 
 
 Franklin Institute 
 Home of the Wright B Flyer
 U.S. Army Aviation Museum
 College Park Aviation Museum
 Wright Experience
 Hill Aerospace Museum
Just The Facts 1910–1914 Wright Model B

External links

 Footage of Wright Model B in flight in 1934 
 Wright B Flyer Inc.

1910s United States sport aircraft
Single-engined twin-prop pusher aircraft
Model B
Biplanes
Aircraft first flown in 1910